The Kaiwá Mission is an entity of the Presbyterian Church of Brazil (IPB), the Independent Presbyterian Church of Brazil (IPIB), and the Indigenous Presbyterians of Brazil (IIPB). Its function is to provide assistance to the indigenous tribes of Brazil for better quality of life. The tribes with which it works are the Kaiwa, Guarani, Xavante, and Kadiweu, located across several Brazilian states and into Paraguay.

In partnership with the churches, the Mission is responsible for several services to assist tribal groups throughout the country of Brazil. It is recognized as a public service at the municipal, state and federal level.

The management, under the leadership of Rev. Beijamim Bernardes, operates on its site near Dourados, Mato Grosso do Sul.  This site was founded in 1928 by an American missionary named Albert Maxwell, and its main function is to support the indigenous population holistically and enable them to live according to their customs and preserve their own identity in their tribal villages. For this purpose the Mission provides bilingual education in the early years, both in the native language and Portuguese, and then continues solely in Portuguese.

The Mission also works in the area of health where, together with the government organization SUS, it provides a hospital exclusively for the indigenous population. The Porta da Esperanca Hospital and Maternity were founded in March 1963, and a Tuberculosis Ward was added in 1980.  The hospital also provides pediatric treatment for undernourished children. Working within the Ministry of Health, the hospital has increased its service to include tribes throughout Brazil.

There is also a Bible Institute on site where the Mission completes its holistic approach in training local indigenous students to provide services for their own people.  These include running mission stations in various reservation villages with churches, schools and small functioning health clinics.

External links 
 Official page of the Presbyterian Church of Brazil
 Secretariat Missions of the IPB

Presbyterianism in Brazil
Christian organisations based in Brazil